Unified command may refer to:
 United Nations Command
 Unified Combatant Command (United States Department of Defense)
 sub-unified command (Joint service subordinate command of a Unified Combatant Command)
 Unified Command (ICS), U.S. federal government incident command system
 Unified Command (Deepwater Horizon oil spill), command system in the Deepwater Horizon oil spill